Meditations is a series of personal writings by Marcus Aurelius, Roman Emperor from AD 161 to 180, recording his private notes to himself and ideas on Stoic philosophy.

Marcus Aurelius wrote the 12 books of the Meditations in Koine Greek as a source for his own guidance and self-improvement.  It is possible that large portions of the work were written at Sirmium, where he spent much time planning military campaigns from 170 to 180. Some of it was written while he was positioned at Aquincum on campaign in Pannonia, because internal notes reveal that the first book was written when he was campaigning against the Quadi on the river Granova (modern-day Hron) and the second book was written at Carnuntum.

It is unlikely that Marcus Aurelius ever intended the writings to be published. The work has no official title, so "Meditations" is one of several titles commonly assigned to the collection. These writings take the form of quotations varying in length from one sentence to long paragraphs.

Structure and themes 

The Meditations is divided into 12 books that chronicle different periods of Aurelius' life. No book is in chronological order, as each was written for the author himself. The style of writing that permeates the text is one that is simplified, straightforward, and perhaps reflecting Aurelius' Stoic perspective.

A central theme to Meditations is the importance of analyzing one's judgment of self and others and developing a cosmic perspective:You have the power to strip away many superfluous troubles located wholly in your judgment, and to possess a large room for yourself embracing in thought the whole cosmos, to consider everlasting time, to think of the rapid change in the parts of each thing, of how short it is from birth until dissolution, and how the void before birth and that after dissolution are equally infinite. Aurelius advocates finding one's place in the universe and sees that everything came from nature, and so everything shall return to it in due time. Another strong theme is of maintaining focus and to be without distraction all the while maintaining strong ethical principles such as "Being a good man."

His Stoic ideas often involve avoiding indulgence in sensory affections, a skill which will free a man from the pains and pleasures of the material world. He claims that the only way a man can be harmed by others is to allow his reaction to overpower him. An order or logos permeates existence. Rationality and clear-mindedness allow one to live in harmony with the logos. This allows one to rise above faulty perceptions of "good" and "bad"—things out of your control like fame and health are (unlike things in your control) irrelevant and neither good nor bad.

History of text
There is no certain mention of the Meditations until the early 10th century. The historian Herodian, writing in the mid-3rd century, makes mention of Marcus' literary legacy, saying "He was concerned with all aspects of excellence, and in his love of ancient literature he was second to no man, Roman or Greek; this is evident from all his sayings and writings which have come down to us", a passage which may refer to the Meditations. The Historia Augusta'''s biography of Avidius Cassius, thought to have been written in the 4th century, records that before Marcus set out on the Marcomannic Wars, he was asked to publish his Precepts of Philosophy in case something should befall him, but he instead "for three days discussed the books of his Exhortations one after the other". A doubtful mention is made by the orator Themistius in about AD 364. In an address to the emperor Valens, On Brotherly Love, he says: "You do not need the exhortations of Marcus." Another possible reference is in the collection of Greek poems known as the Palatine Anthology, a work dating to the 10th century but containing much earlier material. The anthology contains an epigram dedicated to "the Book of Marcus". It has been proposed that this epigram was written by the Byzantine scholar Theophylact Simocatta in the 7th century.

The first direct mention of the work comes from Arethas of Caesarea (c. 860–935), a bishop who was a great collector of manuscripts. At some date before 907 he sent a volume of the Meditations to Demetrius, Archbishop of Heracleia, with a letter saying: "I have had for some time an old copy of the Emperor Marcus' most profitable book, so old indeed that it is altogether falling to pieces.… This I have had copied and am able to hand down to posterity in its new dress." Arethas also mentions the work in marginal notes (scholia) to books by Lucian and Dio Chrysostom where he refers to passages in the "Treatise to Himself", and it was this title which the book bore in the manuscript from which the first printed edition was made in the 16th century. Arethas' own copy has now vanished, but it is thought to be the likely ancestor of the surviving manuscripts.

The next mention of the Meditations is in the Suda lexicon published in the late 10th century. The Suda calls the work "a directing of his own life by Marcus the Emperor in twelve books," which is the first mention of a division of the work into twelve books. The Suda makes use of some thirty quotations taken from books I, III, IV, V, IX, and XI.

Around 1150, John Tzetzes, a grammarian of Constantinople, quotes passages from Books IV and V attributing them to Marcus. About 200 years later Nicephorus Callistus (c. 1295–1360) in his Ecclesiastical History writes that "Marcus Antoninus composed a book for the education of his son Marcus [i.e. Commodus], full of all worldly experience and instruction." The Meditations is thereafter quoted in many Greek compilations from the 14th to 16th centuries.

Wilhelm Xylander first translated the Meditations into Latin in 1558.

Manuscripts
The present-day text is based almost entirely upon two manuscripts. One is the Codex Palatinus (P), also known as the Codex Toxitanus (T), first published in 1558/9 but now lost. The other manuscript is the Codex Vaticanus 1950 (A) in the Vatican Library.

Codex Palatinus
The modern history of the Meditations dates from the issue of the first printed edition (editio princeps) by Wilhelm Xylander in 1558 or 1559. It was published at the instigation of Conrad Gesner and printed by his cousin Andreas Gesner at Zurich. The book was bound with a work by Marinus (Proclus vel De Felicitate, also a first edition). To the Meditations was added a Latin translation by Xylander who also included brief notes. Conrad Gesner stated in his dedicatory letter that he "received the books of Marcus from the gifted poet Michael Toxites from the library of Otto Heinrich, Prince Palatine", i.e. from the collection at Heidelberg University. The importance of this edition of the Meditations is that the manuscript from which it was printed is now lost, so that it is one of the two principal sources of all modern texts.

Codex Vaticanus 1950
The Codex Vaticanus Graecus 1950 is contained in a codex which passed to the Vatican Library from  the collection of Stefano Gradi in 1683. This is a 14th-century manuscript which survives in a very corrupt state, and about forty-two lines have dropped out by accidental omissions.

Other manuscripts
Other manuscripts are of little independent value for reconstructing the text. The main ones are the Codex Darmstadtinus 2773 (D) with 112 extracts from books I–IX, and the Codex Parisinus 319 (C) with 29 extracts from Books I–IV.

 Reception 
Marcus Aurelius has been lauded for his capacity "to write down what was in his heart just as it was, not obscured by any consciousness of the presence of listeners or any striving after effect." Gilbert Murray compares the work to Jean-Jacques Rousseau's Confessions and St. Augustine's Confessions. Though Murray criticizes Marcus for the "harshness and plainness of his literary style", he finds in his Meditations "as much intensity of feeling...as in most of the nobler modern books of religion, only [with] a sterner power controlling it." "People fail to understand Marcus," he writes, "not because of his lack of self-expression, but because it is hard for most men to breathe at that intense height of spiritual life, or, at least, to breathe soberly."

Rees (1992) calls the Meditations "unendingly moving and inspiring," but does not offer them up as works of original philosophy. Bertrand Russell found them contradictory and inconsistent, evidence of a "tired age" where "even real goods lose their savour." Using Marcus as an example of greater Stoic philosophy, he found the Stoic ethical philosophy to contain an element of "sour grapes." "We can't be happy, but we can be good; let us therefore pretend that, so long as we are good, it doesn't matter being unhappy." Both Russell and Rees find an element of Marcus' Stoic philosophy in the philosophical system of Immanuel Kant.

In the Introduction to his 1964 translation of Meditations, the Anglican priest Maxwell Staniforth discussed the profound impact of Stoicism on Christianity. Michael Grant called Marcus Aurelius "the noblest of all the men who, by sheer intelligence and force of character, have prized and achieved goodness for its own sake and not for any reward." Gregory Hays' translation of Meditations for The Modern Library made The Washington Posts bestseller list for two weeks in 2002.

The book has been described as a prototype of reflective practice by Seamus Mac Suibhne. Beatrice Webb, the Labour movement leader who coined the term collective bargaining referred to Meditations as her “manual of devotion.” United States President Bill Clinton said that Meditations is his favorite book, and former United States Secretary of Defense James Mattis carried his own personal copy of The Meditations of Marcus Aurelius throughout his deployments as a Marine Corps officer in the Persian Gulf, Afghanistan and Iraq.Holiday, Ryan, and Stephen Hanselman. 2016. The Daily Stoic: 366 Meditations on Wisdom, Perseverance and the Art of Living. Portfolio/Penguin. 2016. 

Wen Jiabao, the former Prime Minister of China, has said that he has read the Meditations over a hundred times. He also stated that he was "very deeply impressed" by the work.

Select quotations

 Editions 

The editio princeps (first print edition) of the original Greek was published by Conrad Gessner and his cousin Andreas in 1559.  Both it and the accompanying Latin translation were produced by Wilhelm Xylander. His source was a manuscript from Heidelberg University, provided by Michael Toxites. By 1568, when Xylander completed his second edition, he no longer had access to the source and it has been lost ever since. The first English translation was published in 1634 by Meric Casaubon.

Some popular English translations include:
 Francis Hutcheson, and James Moore (1742). The Meditations of the Emperor Marcus Aurelius Antoninus. Indianapolis: Liberty Fund, 2008.
 Richard Graves (1792). Meditations of the Emperor Marcus Aurelius Antoninus, a new translation from the Greek original, with a Life, Notes, &c., by R. Graves, 1792; new edition, Halifax, 1826.
 George Long (1862) The Meditations of Marcus Aurelius; reprinted many times, including in Vol. 2 of the Harvard Classics.
 C. R. Haines (1916) Marcus Aurelius. Loeb Classical Library. 
 A. S. L. Farquharson (1944) Marcus Aurelius Meditations. Everyman's Library reprint edition (1992) . Oxford World's Classics revised edition (1998) 
 Classics Club (1945) Meditations. Marcus Aurelius and his times. Walter J. Black, Inc. New York. 
 Maxwell Staniforth (1969) Meditations. Penguin. 
 Gregory Hays (2002) Meditations. Random House.  (181 pages)
 C. Scot Hicks, David V. Hicks (2002) The Emperor's Handbook: A New Translation of the Meditations. Simon & Schuster. 
 Martin Hammond (2006) Meditations. Penguin Classics. 
 Jacob Needleman, and John P. Piazza (2008) The Essential Marcus Aurelius. J. P. Tarcher.  (111 pages)
 Robin Hard, and Christopher Gill (2011) Meditations with selected correspondence. Oxford University Press .

See also

 John Bourchier, 2nd Baron Berners
 Memento moriReferences

Sources
 
 
 

Further reading
 Annas, Julia. 2004. "Marcus Aurelius: Ethics and Its Background." Rhizai: A Journal for Ancient Philosophy and Science 2:103–119.
 Berryman, Sylvia Ann. 2010. The Puppet and the Sage: Images of the Self in Marcus Aurelius Oxford Studies in Ancient Philosophy 38: 187–209.
 Ceporina, Matteo. 2012. "The Meditations." In A Companion to Marcus Aurelius. Edited by Marcel van Ackeren, 45–61. Oxford: Wiley-Blackwell.
 Dickson, Keith. 2009. "Oneself as Others: Aurelius and Autobiography." Arethusa 42.1: 99–125.
 Gill, Christopher. 2012. "Marcus and Previous Stoic Literature." In A Companion to Marcus Aurelius. Edited by Marcel van Ackeren, 382–395. Oxford: Wiley-Blackwell.
 Hadot, Pierre. 2001. The Inner Citadel: The Meditations of Marcus Aurelius. Cambridge, MA: Harvard Univ. Press.
 Kraye, Jill. 2012. "Marcus Aurelius and Neostoicism in Early Modern Philosophy." In A Companion to Marcus Aurelius. Edited by Marcel van Ackeren, 515–531. Oxford: Wiley-Blackwell.
 Rees, D. A. 2000. "Joseph Bryennius and Marcus Aurelius’ Meditations." Classical Quarterly 52.2: 584–596.
 Robertson, D. How to Think Like a Roman Emperor: The Stoic Philosophy of Marcus Aurelius. 'New York: St. Martin's Press, 2019.
 Rutherford, R. B. 1989. The Meditations of Marcus Aurelius: A Study. Oxford: Oxford Univ. Press.
 Wolf, Edita. 2016. "Others as Matter of Indifference in Marcus Aurelius’ Meditations." Acta Universitatis Carolinae. Graecolatina Pragensia 2:13–23.

External links

Studies
 

Translations
  translated by George Long, at Wikisource 
 The Thoughts of the Emperor Marcus Aurelius Antoninus, by George Long, 1862, at the Stoic Therapy eLibrary
 Marcus Aurelius Antoninus to Himself: an English translation with introductory study on stoicism and the last of the Stoics, by G.H. Rendall, 1898, at the Stoic Therapy eLibrary
 The Meditations by Marcus Aurelius at Project Gutenberg, gutenberg.org
 
 Meditations of the Emperor Marcus Aurelius Antoninus, a new translation from the Greek original, with a Life, Notes, &c., by R. Graves, 1792, at Google Books Multiple editions of the Meditations at the Internet Archive''

2nd-century books
Ancient Greek works
Nerva–Antonine dynasty
Stoicism
Texts in Koine Greek
Marcus Aurelius
Ethics literature